Artistic swimming as synchronized swimming was contested from October 8 to October 9 at the 1994 Asian Games in Big Wave Pool, Hiroshima, Japan. A total of 11 athletes from 5 nations competed in the event, Japan won both gold medals, China won both silver medals and South Korea won all bronze medals.

Medalists

Medal table

Participating nations
A total of 11 athletes from 5 nations competed in artistic swimming at the 1994 Asian Games:

References 

 New Straits Times, October 8–10, 1994
 Results

External links 
 Olympic Council of Asia

 
1994 Asian Games events
1994
Asian Games
1994 Asian Games